Child of Divorce is a 1946 American film directed by Richard O. Fleischer. It was the first film that he directed. RKO had adapted the play to film before as the 1934 film Wednesday's Child.

Plot summary
Young Roberta "Bobby" Carter, only eight years old, catches her mother Joan as she kisses a man who isn't her father in a park. She is especially embarrassed, since her friends are present and recognize her mother.

Bobby's father Ray is away on a business trip, as he so often is, but comes home all of a sudden, bringing a small toy piano as a gift to Bobby. Joan tries to collect enough courage to tell her husband about her affair, but backs out in the last second.

Bobby is bullied for her mother's antics and romantics and ends up asking God to make her parents fall back in love. Unaware of her daughter's discovery, Joan continues to see her lover, Michael Benton.

Soon Ray becomes suspicious because of Joan's frequent absence from their home and asks her about it. Joan confesses that she is seeing another man and that she wants a divorce.

Bobby watches from a hidden position how her parents talk, and how her father slaps her mother in the face. Joan flees the house and is followed by the desperate Bobby. Joan tells her daughter that she is leaving the house and her father immediately and that she is taking Bobby with her. Bobby is crushed.

Months later, Bobby is asked to the stand in her parents' divorce trial, as a witness of her mother's infidelity, but she refuses to leave any information. Her parents divorce and a judge grants Joan custody of Bobby for all year except summer. Later, Joan marries Michael but Bobby refuses to accept Michael as her stepfather.

Michael grows tired of Bobby's behavior and tells Joan that the girl is breaking their marriage apart. When Bobby returns to her father in the summer, she is introduced to his new fiancée, Louise Norman, and gets even more upset.

A psychiatrist tells Joan and Ray that Bobby needs stability and continuity in her life to cope, and strongly suggests that only one of them should have sole custody over her. None of the parents feels up to this task, and instead Bobby is sent away to a boarding school.

Bobby is eventually visited by her parents, one at a time, and one of her schoolmates tells her that she will be used to being alone. To the sound of church bells playing the same tune as on her toy piano, Bobby vows to herself that she will never leave her own children when she grows up, and tuck them to bed every night.

Cast
 Sharyn Moffett as Bobby
 Regis Toomey as Ray
 Madge Meredith as Joan
 Walter Reed as Michael
 Una O'Connor as Nora
 Doris Merrick as Louise
 Harry Cheshire as Judge
 Selmer Jackson as Dr. Sterling
 Lillian Randolph as Carrie
 Pat Prest as Linda
 Gregory Muradian as Freddie
 George McDonald as Donnie
 Patsy Converse as Betty
 Ann Carter as Peggy
Uncredited
 Arthur Space as Joan's attorney
 William Forrest as Proctor

Production
The film was the first feature directed by Richard Fleischer (credited as Richard O. Fleischer), who had directed the This is America documentary series and been signed to a long term contract with RKO. Fleischer says the film was conceived as a vehicle for Sharyn Moffett, "a ten year old actress that the studio hoped would turn into a Shirley Temple or a Margaret O'Brien, a metamorphosis devoutly to be wished. Actually she was a good little actress, better than most of the adults around her. The chrysalis, however, stubbornly refused to turn into a butterfly. She never did fly."

Fleischer was assigned the job in August 1945.

Release
According to Fleischer, "the movie turned out remarkably well." He was then assigned to another Moffett vehicle, Banjo, which did less well.

References

External links
 
 
 
 

1946 films
1946 drama films
American drama films
American black-and-white films
1940s English-language films
American films based on plays
Films directed by Richard Fleischer
RKO Pictures films
Films scored by Leigh Harline
Films about divorce
1946 directorial debut films
1940s American films